Cychrus anatolicus is a species of ground beetle in the subfamily of Carabinae. It was described by Victor Motschulsky in 1865. The species can be found in Armenia and Turkey.

References

anatolicus
Beetles described in 1865